Duplicaria badia is a species of sea snail, a marine gastropod mollusk in the family Terebridae, the auger snails.

Description
The shell size varies between 25 mm and 45 mm.

Distribution
This species occurs in the Pacific Ocean off New Caledonia and Fiji.

References

  Yoo J.-S. [Jong-Saeng]. (1976). Korean shells in colour. Seoul: Il Ji Sa Publishing.
 Terryn Y. (2007). Terebridae: A Collectors Guide. Conchbooks & Natural Art. 59 pp + plates
 Liu, J.Y. [Ruiyu] (ed.). (2008). Checklist of marine biota of China seas. China Science Press. 1267 pp.

External links
 Deshayes, G. P. (1859). A general review of the genus Terebra, and a description of new species. Proceedings of the Zoological Society of London. (1859) 27: 270-321.
 Reeve, L. A. (1860-1861). Monograph of the genus Terebra. In: Conchologia Iconica, or, illustrations of the shells of molluscous animals, vol. 12, pl. 1-27 and unpaginated text. L. Reeve & Co., London.
 Fedosov, A. E.; Malcolm, G.; Terryn, Y.; Gorson, J.; Modica, M. V.; Holford, M.; Puillandre, N. (2020). Phylogenetic classification of the family Terebridae (Neogastropoda: Conoidea). Journal of Molluscan Studies. 85(4): 359-388

Terebridae
Gastropods described in 1859